, also read as Tonna; lay name – Nikaidō Sadamune (二階堂貞宗), was a Japanese Buddhist poet who was a student of Nijō Tameyo. Ton'a took a tonsure at Enryaku-ji Temple, but was later associated with the Ji sect (founded by Ippen). He looked up to Saigyō's poetic genius.

Poetry 

The following are two of his best-known poems:

Notes

Japanese writers of the Muromachi period
14th-century Japanese poets
Kamakura period Buddhist clergy
Buddhist poets